Syringa reticulata, the Japanese tree lilac. is a species of flowering plant in the family Oleaceae native to eastern Asia, which is grown as an ornamental in Europe and North America.

Description
The fruit is a dry, smooth brown capsule (15–25 mm long), splitting in two to release the two winged seeds.

Distribution
Syringa reticulata is found in northern Japan (mainly Hokkaidō), northern China (Gansu, Hebei, Heilongjiang, Henan, Jilin, Liaoning, Nei Mongol, Ningxia, Shaanxi, Shanxi, Sichuan), Korea, and far southeastern Russia (Primorye).

Names
; 

The Latin specific epithet reticulata means "netted".

Subspecies
There are three subspecies:
Syringa reticulata subsp. reticulata (syn. Syringa japonica (Maxim.), also syn. S. amurensis var japonica (Maxim.) Franch et Sav.- Ligustrina japonica (Maxim.) ) - Japan. 
Syringa reticulata subsp. amurensis (Rupr.) P.S.Green & M.C.Chang (syn. S. reticulata var. mandschurica (Maxim.) H.Hara) -  Northeastern China, Korea, southeastern Russia.
Syringa reticulata subsp. pekinensis (Rupr.) P.S.Green & M.C.Chang -  North-central China.  It has very distinct reddish-brown peeling bark.

References

reticulata
Ornamental trees
Trees of China
Trees of Japan
Trees of Korea
Trees of Russia
Flora of Korea
Flora of Sichuan
Flora of Shanxi
Flora of Shaanxi
Flora of Ningxia
Flora of Inner Mongolia
Flora of Liaoning
Flora of Jilin
Flora of Henan
Flora of Heilongjiang
Flora of Hebei
Flora of Gansu
Plants described in 1941